The 2022 LNBP season is the 22nd season of the Liga Nacional de Baloncesto Profesional (LNBP), the top level basketball league of Mexico. The season began on July 12 and ended on October 28, 2022 with Abejas de León got the championship sweep of 4–0 series win over Astros de Jalisco, giving Abejas their 1st Title.

This season features 10 teams. The format was changed since last season, since an overall table was used to determine the 8 teams that qualify for the playoffs (instead of using the East and West Districts).

Fuerza Regia de Monterrey were the defending champions but got eliminated in the Zone Molten Semifinal by Mineros de Zacatecas.

Teams 
Correcaminos UAT Victoria and Mineros de Zacatecas returned to the league. Panteras de Aguascalientes and Leñadores de Durango opted out of the season.

Regular season

Standings 
As of September 21, 2022.

All-Star Game
The 2022 LNBP All-Star Game was played in Guadalajara, Jalisco at the Arena Astros on 28 August 2022. Punto CHG defeated Molten by a score of 153–138. Astros de Jalisco player Brooks DeBisschop was named All-Star Game MVP after scoring 22 points.

Gary Ricks of the Fuerza Regia de Monterrey won the three-point shootout while Manny Hernández of the Libertadores de Querétaro won his second consecutive slam dunk contest title.

Teams 

Punto CHG
 Vander Blue (Libertadores de Querétaro)
 Ken Brown (Plateros de Fresnillo)
 Brooks Debisschop (Astros de Jalisco)
 José Estrada (Halcones de Xalapa)
 Dwayne Morgan (Correcaminos UAT Victoria)
 Aaron Pérez (Correcaminos UAT Victoria)
 Joshua Ramírez (Plateros de Fresnillo)
 Karim Rodríguez (Astros de Jalisco)
 Michael Smith (Abejas de León)
 Bo Spencer (Libertadores de Querétaro)
 Durrell Summers (Mineros de Zacatecas)
 Jordan Williams (Mineros de Zacatecas)
Coaches:  Sergio Valdeolmillos (Astros de Jalisco) and  Iván Deniz (Soles de Mexicali)

Molten
 J. J. Avila (Fuerza Regia de Monterrey)
 Daniel Bejarano (Fuerza Regia de Monterrey)
 Javion Blake (Astros de Jalisco)
 Juan Brussino (Dorados de Chihuahua)
 Omar de Haro (Dorados de Chihuahua)
 Shaquille Johnson (Halcones de Xalapa)
 D.J. Laster (Soles de Mexicali)
 Jordan Loveridge (Astros de Jalisco)
 Tre McLean (Abejas de León)
 Gary Ricks (Fuerza Regia de Monterrey)
 Donald Sims (Dorados de Chihuahua)
 Jordan Stevens (Correcaminos UAT Victoria
Coaches:  Sebastián González (Dorados de Chihuahua) and  Nicolás Casalánguida (Fuerza Regia de Monterrey)

Source:

Statistics

Individual statistical leaders 
As of September 21, 2022.

Awards

National Most Valuable Player: Jorge Gutiérrez, Astros de Jalisco
Foreign Most Valuable Player: Donald Sims,  Dorados de Chihuahua
 Finals Most Valuable Player: Michael Smith, Abejas de León
Rookie of the Year: Diego Willis, Libertadores de Querétaro
Revelation of the Year: Moisés Andriassi, Soles de Mexicali
Coach of the Year: Sergio Valdeolmillos, Astros de Jalisco

Source:

References 

2022 in basketball leagues
Liga Nacional de Baloncesto Profesional